Turlapaty Kutumba Rao (August 10, 1933 – 11 January 2021) was an Indian journalist and orator, known for his service to journalism in Telugu language. He is reported to have written over 4000 biographies and delivered over 16000 public speeches which has been recorded by the Telugu Book of Records as a world record.

Biography
Kutumba Rao was born in 1933 at Vijayawada in the South Indian state of Andhra Pradesh. He was a secretary to T. Prakasham, former Chief Minister of the state and was known to have mooted the idea of demarcating states on the basis of language in 1947, when India became independent. He was also a chairman of the Andhra Pradesh Grandhayala Parishad, a policy making body of the Government of Andhra Pradesh. The journey of his life is recorded in his autobiography, Naa Kalam - Naa Galam, released in 2012.

He was a recipient of the Pratibha Puraskar from the Telugu University, Kalaprapoorna title from Andhra University and the title of Guardian of Telugu from C. Rajagopalachari, then Governor of Andhra Pradesh. Rao received the President's Gold Medal. He was honored by the Government of India, in 2002, with the fourth highest Indian civilian award of Padma Shri making him the first journalist from the state of Andhra Pradesh to receive the award. He was also a nominee for Padma Bhushan for the year 2014.

References

External links
 
 

1933 births
2021 deaths
Recipients of the Padma Shri in literature & education
Journalists from Andhra Pradesh
Writers from Vijayawada
Telugu-language writers
20th-century Indian biographers
Telugu writers
20th-century Indian journalists
Indian male journalists
20th-century Indian male writers
Male biographers